"The Many Ways" is the third single from Usher's album Usher.

The single underperformed on the Billboard charts, peaking at number 42 on the Hot R&B/Hip-Hop Singles & Tracks chart, while missing the Billboard Hot 100 altogether.

The music video was directed by Hype Williams.

Track listing
US Single
1. Many Ways [Album Version]
2. Many Ways [Radio Version]
3. Many Ways [Album Instrumental]

Charts

1995 singles
Usher (musician) songs
Music videos directed by Hype Williams
Song recordings produced by Dave Hall (record producer)
1994 songs
LaFace Records singles
Songs written by Al B. Sure!
Songs written by Dave Hall (record producer)
New jack swing songs